Cynthia Shalom  (born 18 March 1988) is a Nigerian actress, producer, blogger,  and businessperson. She won season 11 of the reality show, Next Movie Star. She has since then featured in several Nollywood films. She was featured in the M-net TV series Tinsel.

Early life and education 

Cynthia Shalom was born in Ede, Osun State, Nigeria. She is the first daughter from a family of three sons and two daughters. She had her Primary and Secondary Education in Port Harcourt where she lived with her parents.  Having obtained a degree in Management from the University of Port Harcourt and an Acting certification from the Africa International Film Festival (AFRIFF) talent development workshop, In an interview with Vanguard Nigeria she said she relocated to Lagos to pursue her career in acting.

Career 
Shalom was the winner of the Next Movie Star Reality Show in 2015/2016. She made her acting debut in Monalisa Chinda’s Talk show titled You & I with Monalisa. She told The Punch that rejections were one of the hurdles she had to surmount while starting out in Nollywood. In 2016, she was cast in her first feature film An Hour With The Shrink with Annie Macaulay-Idibia, Gbenro Ajibade, and Segun Arinze. Shalom co-starred with Desmond Elliot in The Damned an Irokotv film. In 2018, Shalom started her film production company, Cynthia Shalom Productions. Her role in one of her movies titled Chain, which features Eddie Watson, Enado Odigie, Emem Ufot, earned her two individual nominations; Best Actress in a Leading role and Most Promising Actress at the 2019 Best of Nollywood Awards.

Selected filmography

Films 
 Next Movie Star (2015/2016)
 Iquo’s Journal  (2015).
 An Hour With The Shrink (2016)
 Thorns of love (2016)
 No I Dont (2017)
 The Damned  (2017)
 Roberta  (2017)
 Karma  (2017)
 Ebomisi (Irokotv) (2018).
 Chain (2018)
 Driver  (2018)
 Altered Desire  (Africa Magic) (2019)
 Beauty in the Broken  (Irokotv) (2019)
 The Second Bed (2020).
 Back to the Wild (Irokotv) (2019)
 Love Castle  (2019)
 Rachel’s Triumph  (2019)
 Shut  (2020)
 Fading Blues (Irokotv) (2020)
 Wind of Desire  (2020)
 Half shot of sunrise (Irokotv) (2020)
 Birth Hurts (2020)
 Benediction (Irokotv) (2021)
Love Castle (2021)

Television 
 Dear Diary  Season 2 (2016).
 Tales of Eve (2017)
 I5ive  (2019)
 Jela (2019)
 Tinsel  (2017-present)

Awards and nominations

References

External links
 

Actresses from Lagos State
Nigerian television actresses
1988 births
Igbo actresses
Living people
21st-century Nigerian actresses
Nigerian film actresses
Participants in Nigerian reality television series
Nigerian film producers
University of Port Harcourt alumni
People from Ebonyi State
Nigerian businesspeople
Nigerian women in business